Gastão Elias was the defending champion but lost in the first round to André Ghem.

Christian Garín won the title after defeating Guido Andreozzi 3–6, 7–5, 7–6(7–3) in the final.

Seeds

Draw

Finals

Top half

Bottom half

References
Main Draw
Qualifying Draw

Lima Challenger - Singles